The 1920 Ashton-under-Lyne by-election was a by-election held on 31 January 1920 for the British House of Commons constituency of Ashton-under-Lyne.

The by-election was triggered by the elevation to the peerage of the town's Conservative Party Member of Parliament (MP) Albert Stanley, who was ennobled as Baron Ashfield.

The result was a victory for the Conservative candidate Sir Walter de Frece, who held the seat with a massively reduced majority.

British Pathe has a newsreel clip of Sir Walter Frece campaigning in the by-election with his wife Vesta Tilley.
http://www.britishpathe.com/video/miss-vesta-tilley/query/election

Votes

References

See also 
 Ashton-under-Lyne constituency
 1928 Ashton-under-Lyne by-election
 1931 Ashton-under-Lyne by-election
 1939 Ashton-under-Lyne by-election
 1945 Ashton-under-Lyne by-election
 List of United Kingdom by-elections (1918–1931)

Ashton-under-Lyne 1920
Ashton-under-Lyne
Ashton-under-Lyne by-election
Ashton-under-Lyne 1920
Ashton-under-Lyne by-election 1920
Ashton-under-Lyne
Ashton-under-Lyne 1920
Ashton-under-Lyne by-election